The 1929–30 season was the eighth season of competitive association football and first season in the Football League played by York City Football Club, a professional football club based in York, Yorkshire, England. They finished in sixth position in the 22-team 1929–30 Football League Third Division North. They entered the 1929–30 FA Cup in the first round and lost in the third to Newcastle United.

20 players made at least one appearance in nationally organised first-team competition, and there were 11 different goalscorers. Half-back Ollie Thompson played in all 48 first-team matches over the season. Billy Bottrill and Tom Fenoughty finished as leading goalscorers with 20 goals each. Bottrill scored 18 in league competition and two in the FA Cup, while Fenoughty scored 15 in league competition and five in the FA Cup.

Match details

Football League Third Division North

League table (part)

FA Cup

Appearances and goals
Players with names struck through and marked  left the club during the playing season.
Key to positions: GK – Goalkeeper; FB – Full back; HB – Half back; FW – Forward

See also
List of York City F.C. seasons

References
General

Source for kit: 
Source for match dates, results, appearances, goalscorers and attendances: 
Source for league positions: 
Source for player details: 

Specific

1929–30
English football clubs 1929–30 season
Foot